The South African type X-20 water tender was a Garratt steam locomotive tender.

Type X-20 water tenders first entered service in 1956, as auxiliary water tenders to the second batch of Class GMA  Double Mountain type Garratt steam locomotives which entered service on the South African Railways in that year.

Manufacturer
The Type X-20 water tenders were built by the South African Railways (SAR) in its Pietermaritzburg shops between 1956 and 1958.

Altogether 95 more Class GMA Garratt articulated steam locomotives with a  Double Mountain type wheel arrangement entered service on the SAR between 1956 and 1958. Like the Classes GM and GO, the Class GMA was a tank-and-tender Garratt which ran with a semi-permanently coupled purpose-built auxiliary water tender to augment its meagre water capacity.

The Type X-20 water tender entered service as tenders to these 95 locomotives.

Characteristics

The water tenders had a low flat-topped turret with a hinged hatch and a curved handrail across the tank barrel, similar to that of the Type MX tender. It rode on SARCAST bogies (similar to North American Bettendorf trucks) with coil springs.

Locomotives
Only the second and third batches of Class GMA locomotives, 95 in total and numbered in the range from 4051 to 4170, were equipped with Type X-20 water tenders upon entering service. 100 of these water tenders were built and were originally numbered for these engines in the number range as shown, while the numbers of the five extra tenders possibly followed on to no. 4175. The tenders were painted black with red buffer beams.

Preservation
After the end of steam operations in the late 1980s, most of the watering facilities which once existed country-wide have either fallen into disuse or been removed. The Ceres-based Ceres Rail Company therefore often operate their preserved Classes 19B and 19D steam locomotives with preserved auxiliary water tenders to extend their water range.

Illustration

References

X-20